Bernd Korzynietz (born 8 September 1979) is a German former footballer.

References

External links 
 

1979 births
Living people
German footballers
1. FC Schweinfurt 05 players
Borussia Mönchengladbach players
Borussia Mönchengladbach II players
Arminia Bielefeld players
VfL Wolfsburg players
MSV Duisburg players
Bundesliga players
2. Bundesliga players
Sportspeople from Würzburg
Germany B international footballers
Germany under-21 international footballers
Association football defenders
Footballers from Bavaria